In mathematics, a natural number in a given number base is a -Kaprekar number if the representation of its square in that base can be split into two parts, where the second part has  digits, that add up to the original number. The numbers are named after D. R. Kaprekar.

Definition and properties 
Let  be a natural number. We define the Kaprekar function for base  and power   to be the following:
, 
where  and 

For example, in base 10, 45 is a 2-Kaprekar number, because 
 
 
 

There are only a finite number of -Kaprekar numbers and cycles for a given base , because if , where  then 

 

Only when  do Kaprekar numbers and cycles exist. 

In base , all even perfect numbers are Kaprekar numbers.

Set-theoretic definition and unitary divisors
We can define the set  for a given integer  as the set of integers  for which there exist natural numbers  and  satisfying the Diophantine equation
 , where 
 
An -Kaprekar number for base  is then one which lies in the set .

Then the function  is a bijection from the set of unitary divisors of  onto the set .

Kaprekar numbers for

b = 4k + 3 and p = 2n + 1
Then: 
  is a Kaprekar number.

  is a Kaprekar number for all natural numbers .

b = m2k + m + 1 and p = mn + 1
Then: 
  is a Kaprekar number.
  is a Kaprekar number.

b = m2k + m + 1 and p = mn + m − 1
Then: 
  is a Kaprekar number.
  is a Kaprekar number.

b = m2k + m2 − m + 1 and p = mn + 1
Then: 
  is a Kaprekar number.
  is a Kaprekar number.

b = m2k + m2 − m + 1 and p = mn + m − 1
Then: 
  is a Kaprekar number.
  is a Kaprekar number.

All numbers are in base .

Extension to negative integers
Kaprekar numbers can be extended to the negative integers by use of a signed-digit representation to represent each integer.

See also
 Arithmetic dynamics
 Automorphic number
 Dudeney number
 Factorion
 Happy number
 Kaprekar's constant
 Meertens number
 Narcissistic number
 Perfect digit-to-digit invariant
 Perfect digital invariant
 Sum-product number

Notes

References 
 
 
 

Arithmetic dynamics
Base-dependent integer sequences
Diophantine equations
Number theory